Bob Davenport (born April 30, 1933) is an American former gridiron football player and coach. Davenport was raised in Long Beach, California, and played college football at the fullback position for the UCLA Bruins football team. He was selected by the Football Writers Association of America as a first-team player on its 1954 College Football All-America Team.  Davenport declined an offer from the Cleveland Browns as they held Sunday sporting events that contradicted his Christian commitment to observing the Lord's Day. He played professionally with the Winnipeg Blue Bombers of the Western Interprovincial Football Union—a forerunner of the Canadian Football League (CFL)—in 1956 and 1957.  He served as the head football coach at Taylor University in Upland, Indiana from 1957 to 1966, compiling a record of 53–41–3.  Davenport later became a competitive cycler.

References

1933 births
Living people
American football fullbacks
American players of Canadian football
UCLA Bruins football players
Taylor Trojans football coaches
Winnipeg Blue Bombers players
Players of American football from Long Beach, California
Players of Canadian football from Long Beach, California
American Christians